Gonepatica is a monotypic moth genus of the family Erebidae erected by Shigero Sugi in 1982. Its only species, Gonepatica opalina, was first described by Arthur Gardiner Butler in 1879. It is found in Japan and Amur Oblast, Russia.

References

Calpinae
Monotypic moth genera